Mandulis was a god of ancient Nubia also worshipped in Egypt. The name Mandulis is the Greek form of Merul or Melul, a non-Egyptian name. The centre of his cult was the Temple of Kalabsha at Talmis, but he also had a temple dedicated to him at Ajuala.

The worship of Mandulis was unknown in Egypt under the native Pharaohs, the Temple of Kalabsha being constructed under the Ptolemies (305 to 30BC). The temple was popular during the Roman period. It was expanded under the emperors Augustus (27BC–AD14) and Vespasian (AD69–79). A series of dated inscriptions can be found in the temple from the reign of Vespasian down to AD248 or 249. In one of these he is identified as the "Sun, the all-seeing master, king of all, all-powerful Aion."

Besides his own temples at Kalabsha and Ajuala, Mandulis was worshiped in the Temple of Petesi and Pihor at Dendur and at Philae. An inscription at Dendur identifies him as the "great god, lord of Talmis", clearly indicating the centre of his cult. At Philae, he is depicted on a wall next to the last known hieroglyphic inscription, which was dedicated to him in AD394.

Mandulis was often depicted wearing an elaborate headdress of ram's horns, cobras and plumes surmounted by sun discs. He was sometimes shown in the form of a hawk, but with a human head.

References

Further reading

Nubian gods
Egyptian gods
Solar gods
Horus